Viipurin Reipas was an ice hockey club based in Viipuri (Vyborg). Its ice hockey section was established in 1928. It played in the SM-Sarja for two seasons (1928 and 1932)

Reipas was one of the six first hockey teams that played in the first Finnish Championship in 1928.

Relocation 
After The Winter War and The Continuation War, the city of Viipuri was ceded to Soviet Union and Reipas was forced to move within Finnish borders. In 1945 Reipas relocated to Lahti where it continued, in the new home town of the evacuees, under its original name until renamed to Lahden Reipas. In 1975, Kiekkoreipas was formed to take over hockey operations.

References 

Sport in Vyborg